McCamey may refer to:

McCamey, Texas, city in Texas, United States
Demetri McCamey (born 1989), American basketball player
Dickie, McCamey & Chilcote, American law firm